Rugby Calvisano is an Italian rugby union club currently competing in the Top12. They are based in Calvisano (Province of Brescia), in Lombardy. They were founded in 1970 by a group of players: Tonino Montanari, Gianluigi Vaccari and Alfredo Gavazzi. In 1992 the club became “Rugby Calvisano S.r.l.”

History
Calvisano were founded in 1970 by a group of players, in 1992 the club became “Rugby Calvisano S.r.l.” Calvisano first qualified for European competition for the 1999–2000 season, where they competed in the European Challenge Cup, playing six pool games, though they did not win any. They qualified for their first Heineken Cup for the 2001–02 season, though it was season after where the club won a couple of their pool games, but they have yet to make the finals.

Honours
 Italian championship
 Champions (7): 2004–05, 2007–08, 2011–12, 2013–14, 2014–15, 2016–17, 2018−19
 Runners-up (7): 2000–01, 2001–02, 2002–03, 2003–04, 2005–06, 2015–16, 2017–18
 Coppa Italia
 Champions (1): 2003–04
 Runners-up (3): 1998–99, 2002–03, 2006–07
 Excellence Trophy
 Champions (2): 2011–12, 2014–15
 Intercontinental Cup
 Champions (1): 2006
 European Rugby Continental Shield
 Champions (1): 2019

Current squad
The Calvisano squad for 2022–23 season:

Selected former players

Italian players
Former players who have played for Calvisano and have caps for Italy:

  Manfredi Albanese
  Caludio Appiani
  Sergio Appiani
  Valerio Bernabò
  Massimo Bonomi
  Paolo Buso
  Pablo Canavosio
  Tommaso Castello
  Martin Castrogiovanni
  Lorenzo Cittadini
  Salvatore Costanzo
  Giambattista Croci
  Marcello Cuttitta
  Massimo Cuttitta
  David Dal Maso
  Tommaso D'Apice
  Giampiero De Carli
  Andrea De Rossi
  Jaco Erasmus
  Gabriel Filizzola
  Gonzalo García
  Leonardo Ghiraldini
  Renato Giammarioli
  Paul Griffen
  Kelly Haimona
  Giorgio Intoppa
  Benjamin de Jager
  Andrea Lovotti
  Roberto Mandelli
  Andrea Marcato
  Roland de Marigny
  Nicola Mazzucato
  Maxime Mbanda
  Luke McLean
  Matteo Minozzi
   Alex Moreno
  Andrea Moretti
  Ludovico Nitoglia
  Guglielmo Palazzani
  Sami Panico
  Gert Peens
  Aaron Persico
  Salvatore Perugini
  Simon Picone
  Marco Platania
  Andrea Pratichetti
  Matteo Pratichetti
  Giovanni Raineri
  Massimo Ravazzolo
  Marco Riccioni
  Lorenzo Romano
  Andrea Scanavacca
  Fabio Semenzato
  Antonio Spagnoli
  Warren Spragg
  Marko Stanojevic
  Braam Steyn
  Paolo Vaccari
  Marcello Violi
  Michele Visentin
  Samuela Vunisa
  Maurizio Zaffiri
  Alessandro Zanni
  Cristiano Zanoletti
  Matteo Zanusso
  Giosuè Zilocchi

Foreign players
Former players who have played for Calvisano and have caps for their respective country:

  Gabriel Bocca
  Franco Brarda
  Emiliano Mulieri
  Juan León Novillo
  Joaquín Paz
  Rod Moore
  Sekonaia Kalou
  Shayne Philpott
  Johan Ackermann
  Ben Evans
  Tusi Pisi
  Florin Surugiu
  Florin Vlaicu
  Paino Hehea
  Milton Ngauamo

Statistics

European Challenge Cup

Heineken Cup

References

External links
 Official website

Italian rugby union teams
Rugby clubs established in 1970
Province of Brescia